Megacraspedus grossisquammellus is a moth of the family Gelechiidae. It was described by Pierre Chrétien in 1925. It is found in Spain.

The forewings are ochreous yellow with brownish scales. The hindwings are whitish.

References

Moths described in 1925
Megacraspedus